Cryptascoma is a fungal genus in the family Valsaceae. This is a monotypic genus, containing the single species Cryptascoma bisetula.

References

External links

Diaporthales
Monotypic Sordariomycetes genera